David Eugenio de Lima Salas (born 1959) is a Venezuelan politician.

Career 
He was elected Governor of the state of Anzoátegui in the 2000 regional elections for the MVR. He later broke with the MVR and lost to his MVR successor, Tarek Saab, in the 2004 elections.

De Lima was a member of the  Movement for Socialism (MAS) for 32 years, but in 2012 described MAS as "a failed project". He was elected to the 1999 Constituent Assembly of Venezuela.

De Lima accused his successor as governor, Tarek Saab, of using his position for political persecution, after Saab's wife accused De Lima of mismanagement.

De Lima is a lawyer by training, having graduated from the Central University of Venezuela in 1987.

See also
 2012 Venezuelan presidential election#Capriles

References

1959 births
Living people
Governors of Anzoátegui
People from Puerto la Cruz
Central University of Venezuela alumni
Movement for Socialism (Venezuela) politicians
Fifth Republic Movement politicians
Members of the Venezuelan Constituent Assembly of 1999